{
  "type": "FeatureCollection",
  "features": [
    {
      "type": "Feature",
      "properties": {"title": "Chandola Lake", "marker-symbol": "water", "marker-size": "small",},
      "geometry": {
        "type": "Point",
        "coordinates": [
          72.5871605880093,
          22.986789130656533
        ]
      }
    }
  ]
}

Chandola Lake is located near Dani Limda Road, Ahmedabad, Gujarat state, India and covers an area of 1200 hectares. It is a water reservoir, embanked and circular in form. It is also home for cormorants, painted storks and spoonbill birds. During the evening time, many people visit this place and take a leisure stroll.

History 
Chandola Lake was established by the wife of a Mughal Sultan of Ahmedabad named Tajn Khan Nari Ali. It was in existence when Asha Bhil founded Ashaval.

The historic Salt March around nine in the morning, after covering a distance of seven miles from the Sabarmati Ashram and a few minutes after the trucks and the taxis carrying radio and print journalists had disappeared down the road, had reached the Chandola Lake. Mahatma Gandhi had stopped under a large pipal tree next to the lake, no bigger than a small pond in the middle of a vast expanse of mud during March, 1930.

Usage 
Water from this lake is used for irrigation and industrial purposes. It is also being used for agriculture, as well as for other purposes like processing of waste oil and plastics.

The Kharicut Canal Scheme which is one of the oldest irrigation schemes of Gujarat was constructed with the main purpose of providing irrigation to 1,200 acres of rice land near Chandola lake in Ahmedabad.

Pollution and encroachment 
Large-scale encroachment have been built on this water body. Kharicut, the lake’s feeder canal is choked with filth and garbage.

Chandola Lake Development Plans

The Ahmedabad Municipal Corporation (AMC) has ambitious plans for developing Chandola lake in a big way. AMC has also drawn an exhaustive plan for the upkeep of Chandola lake, which till now was a neglected public space. The AMC has tendered jobs for cleaning and sanitation activities to be carried out around Chandola. The civic body has earmarked Rs 3.70 lakh for clearing the garbage from the lake.

References

External links 
Chandola Lake at ahmedabad.org.uk
Chandola Lake at ahmedabad.clickindia.com
Chandola Lake at touristplaces.org

See also 

 Kankaria Lake
 Vastrapur Lake
 Thol Lake

Lakes of Gujarat
Tourist attractions in Ahmedabad district
Reservoirs in India